Roger Stanton Baum (born 1938) is a former banker and stockbroker, and currently (as of 2005) a children's author. Baum publishes by the name Roger S. Baum. He also tours the country, reading from and signing his children's books.

Biography 
Baum is a former resident of Los Angeles, since which he has lived in Missouri (Springfield) and Nevada (Las Vegas). Baum is a great-grandson of L. Frank Baum, the original creator of the "Oz" series, and grandson of Frank Joslyn Baum, who published The Laughing Dragon of Oz in 1935. Many of Roger S. Baum's children's books are set in the same world.

Baum had written short stories and another children's book, entitled Long Ears And Tailspin In Candy Land (1968), before being asked by the International Wizard of Oz Club in 1987 to write original "Oz" stories. The success of his "Oz" books allowed him to leave his banking job in 1990, and become a full-time children's author. Sometimes Baum's earlier material is reworked in his later books; Long Ears And Tailspin In Candy Land's "Candy Land" reappears in his 2000 Toto book, for example.
His work does not follow the history of the canon Famous Forty Oz books, even disregarding information given by his great-grandfather's fourteen.

Baum's book Lion of Oz and the Badge of Courage was adapted into the film Lion of Oz (2000). A film adaptation of his book Dorothy of Oz was produced by Summertime Entertainment. It was titled Legends of Oz: Dorothy's Return, and was released during 2014.

Selected bibliography

Oz series:
 Dorothy of Oz (1989, 2012), illus. by Elizabeth Miles
 The Rewolf of Oz (1990), illus. Charlotte Hart
 The SillyOzbuls of Oz (1991), illus. Lisa Mertins
 The SillyOzbul of Oz and Toto (1992), illus. Lisa Mertins
 The SillyOzbul of Oz and the Magic Merry-Go-Round (1992), illus. Lisa Mertins
 Lion of Oz and the Badge of Courage (1995, 2003), illus. Sean Coons
 The Green Star of Oz: A Special Oz Story (2000), illus. Victoria Seitzinger
 Toto in Candy Land of Oz (2000), illus. Ronit Berkovitz
 The Wizard of Oz and the Magic Merry-Go-Round (2002), illus. Victoria Seitzinger
 Toto of Oz and the Surprise Party (2004), illus. Victoria Seitzinger
 The Oz Odyssey (2006), illus. Victoria Seitzinger
 Candy Cane: An Oz Christmas Tale (2010), illus. Chad Thomas
 Oz Odyssey II (2011), illus. Chad Thomas
 The Oz Enigma (2013), illus. Kathy Hoyt

Stand-alone:
 Long Ears and Tailspin in Candy Land: A Faraway Adventure (1968), illus. Mary Ann Farmer

References

External links

Official site
Dorothy of OZ movie

1938 births
20th-century American novelists
20th-century American male writers
21st-century American novelists
American children's writers
American fantasy writers
American male novelists
Living people
Oz (franchise)
American male short story writers
20th-century American short story writers
21st-century American short story writers
21st-century American male writers
Baum family